Duncan Shaw may refer to:
 Duncan Shaw (judge)
 Duncan Shaw (rugby union)
 Duncan Shaw (minister, born 1925)
 Duncan Shaw (minister, born 1727)